Meloe angusticollis, commonly known as short-winged blister beetle or oil beetle, is a species of blister beetle, native to North America. They average  in length.

References

Meloidae
Beetles of North America
Beetles described in 1824